The Prelude to the Dream was a dirt late model race held at Eldora Speedway in Rossburg, Ohio from 2005 to 2012. It was a pay-per-view event on HBO, and frequently attracted drivers from various disciplines such as NASCAR, IndyCar Series, NHRA, and World of Outlaws.

The Prelude was a charity race, with the 2012 race benefiting Feed the Children, in which money gained from the broadcast was donated to the foundation. Feed the Children also sent food trucks to the hometowns of the top ten finishers in the race. The race has also benefited other charities, such as Victory Junction Gang Camp, which was aided by the Prelude from 2005 to 2008. In 2009, military organizations  Fisher House Foundation, Intrepid Fallen Heroes Fund, Operation Homefront and the Wounded Warrior Project were funded by the race. Cincinnati Children's Hospital Medical Center, Levine Children's Hospital, Riley Hospital for Children, St. Jude Children's Research Hospital, Children's Healthcare of Atlanta, Children's Medical Center Dallas and the St. Louis Children's Hospital were the groups benefited from the Prelude. From 2005 to 2011, the Prelude donated a total of $3.5 million to charities.

The race starting grid was determined by 4 heat races of 10 laps each.

Race history
Kenny Wallace, driving the No. 23 Sheltra & Sons Construction Chevrolet, won the inaugural Prelude in 2005 after leading all 25 laps. The 2006 Nextel Prelude to the Dream was postponed from its original date June 7 to September 6 due to rain. In the race, track owner Tony Stewart won. The following year, Jeff Gordon and Carl Edwards battled for much of the race, but Edwards managed to win. In 2008, Stewart held off Robby Gordon to win his second Prelude. The 2009 race was postponed due to rain to September 9; it was won by Stewart once again passing Kenny Wallace on lap 13 and dominated for the remainder of the race, winning with a 3.358-second lead over second-place finisher Clint Bowyer.

The 2010 race featured a new team concept, consisting of four teams representing four children's hospitals being benefited by the race. The teams were:

The top five from each team was scored, and if there was a tiebreaker between two teams, the sixth best finisher was also scored. The team with the lowest score won, and its hospital received 45% of the net money gained, the runner-up earned 25%, while the third and fourth place teams received 15%. The race was marred by cautions; three cautions occurred on lap one, followed by four more, and then a final pair of cautions in the final 5 laps. In the end, Jimmie Johnson prevailed, as did Team Levine with 45 points; St. Jude finished second with 48, followed by Cincinnati (49) and Riley (71). The 2011 race also featured the team format, also benefiting children's hospitals.

Clint Bowyer dominated the 2011 race, leading all 30 laps and won with a .531 second margin lead over J. J. Yeley. The following year, the race was expanded from 30 to 40 laps. Clint Bowyer and Kasey Kahne competed for much of the race, but with 16 laps left, Kahne crashed into a spinning Bobby Labonte and Kyle Busch took the lead en route to the win.

On October 18, 2012, Eldora Speedway released a statement that the 2013 Prelude would not be held, citing "logistics associated with the Dream's expansion for the dirt Late Model teams that supplied the cars for the Prelude, along with speedway officials who must transition the facility" as reasons for the exclusion from the 2013 event schedule.

Past winners

References

Further reading

External links
 

2005 establishments in Ohio
Auto races in the United States
Dirt track racing in the United States
Motorsport in Ohio
Recurring sporting events established in 2005
Tony Stewart